Bobby Singh (1974 - 25 December 2012)  was a noted Indian cinematographer who worked in Bollywood, most known for films like Gangster  (2006), Life in a Metro (2007), The Dirty Picture (2011) and Queen (2014). He died following an asthma attack in Goa on 25 December 2012 at the age of 38.

Career
Singh started his career in 1999 as an assistant cameraman in Sarfarosh (1999) and later also did additional photography for Ghajini (2008) directed by A. R. Murugadoss.  Eventually, he made his debut as an independent cinematographer with crime thriller Gangster  (2006) directed by Anurag Basu and starring Shiney Ahuja, Emraan Hashmi and debutant Kangna Ranaut. He worked again with Basu in Life in a Metro (2007). His next big film was Milan Luthria's National Film Award-winning biopic The Dirty Picture (2011) starring Vidya Balan.

He died suddenly following an asthma attack on 25 December 2012, at the age of 38. At the time, he was on a holiday in Goa, with wife and son.  At the time of his death, he had completed the shooting of Special Chabbis, which was released, posthumously, in February 2013. He had also shot 90% of Kangana Ranaut's Queen, directed by Vikas Bahl, which was eventually released in 2014. Siddharth Diwan shot the remaining portions of the film.

Filmography

Personal life
He is survived by his wife Radhika and son Sumer living in Mumbai, while his parents live in Ahmedabad. One of his family dogs died after bobby's death.

References

External links
 
 

Hindi film cinematographers
1974 births
2012 deaths
Deaths from asthma